The Man Without a Country is a 1937 American short drama film directed by Crane Wilbur in Technicolor. It was nominated for an Academy Award at the 10th Academy Awards in 1937 for Best Short Subject (Color). This film is preserved in the Library of Congress.

It is a remake of the 1917 film of the same name, based on the story by Edward Everett Hale. Actor Holmes Herbert appeared in both versions. A 1925 Fox film based on the story and directed by Rowland V. Lee is now considered to be a lost film.

Cast
 John Litel as Lt. Philip Nolan
 Gloria Holden as Marian Morgan
 Ted Osborne as Jack Morgan 
 Donald Brian as Col. Morgan
 Holmes Herbert as Aaron Burr
 Erville Alderson as Andrew Jackson (uncredited) 
 Wilfred Lucas as Lincoln's Secretary (uncredited) 
 Charles Middleton as Abraham Lincoln (uncredited)

References

External links

1937 films
1937 drama films
1937 short films
American drama films
1930s English-language films
Films directed by Crane Wilbur
Short film remakes
Warner Bros. short films
1930s American films